is a Japanese professional shogi player ranked 7-dan.

Early life
Ishikawa was born in Shinjuku, Tokyo on March 5, 1963. He entered the Japan Shogi Association's apprentice school at the rank 6-kyū under the guidance of shogi professional  in 1977. He was promoted to apprentice professional 1-dan in 1980, and obtained full professional status and the rank of 4-dan in 1986.

Shogi professional
Ishikawa finished the finished the 73rd Meijin Class C2 league (April 2014March 2015) with a record of 3 wins and 7 losses, earning a third demotion point which meant automatic demotion to "Free Class" play.

Promotion history
The promotion history for Ishikawa is as follows:
 6-kyū: 1977
 1-dan: 1980
 4-dan: May 14, 1986
 5-dan: July 16, 1991
 6-dan: July 30, 1998
 7-dan: October 23, 2007

Awards and honors
Ishikawa received the JSA's "25 Years Service Award" in 2011 in recognition of being an active professional for twenty-five years.

References

External links
ShogiHub: Professional Player Info · Ishikawa, Akio

1963 births
Japanese shogi players
Living people
Professional shogi players
Professional shogi players from Tokyo
Free class shogi players
People from Shinjuku